Tewkesbury railway station was a station on the Midland Railway between Great Malvern and Evesham.

History
The first station at Tewkesbury was in the High Street.   It was originally opened by the Birmingham and Gloucester Railway in 1840 as the terminus of its branch from Ashchurch.   The first station was replaced in 1864 by a new one built outside the town centre for the Tewkesbury and Malvern Railway.  This closed on 14 August 1961, when the Ashchurch to Upton-on-Severn passenger service was withdrawn by British Railways (through trains to  had previously ceased in December 1952).  Freight traffic continued until final closure in December 1964.

The town is currently served by Ashchurch for Tewkesbury railway station, approximately two miles from Tewkesbury.

Accidents and incidents
Henry Kirwan, stationmaster, lost his life in an accident in 1858. An engine was going towards the quay and Henry Kirwan was on the footplate. He jumped off whilst the engine was still in motion when he fell against a wall and was struck by the engine. Despite having his foot amputated he later succumbed to his injuries.

Services

References

Further reading

External links
 Disused stations
 Extracts from news reports relating to the Ashchurch-Tewkesbury-Tewkesbury Quay branch line.

Disused railway stations in Gloucestershire
Tewkesbury
Former Midland Railway stations
Railway stations in Great Britain opened in 1840
Railway stations in Great Britain closed in 1961